Langxinzhuang station is a subway station on the Line 7 of the Beijing Subway.

History 
The station was formerly called Dougezhuang station. In May 2019, the Beijing Municipal Commission of Planning and Natural Resources  proposed a naming plan for the stations of the eastern extension of Line 7, and they planned to name it Lang Xin Zhuang station. On November 20, 2019, the station was officially named Lang Xin Zhuang station. The station opened on December 28, 2019.

Station layout 
The station has an underground island platform.

Exits 
There are 3 exits, lettered A, B, and D. Exit A is accessible.

References

Beijing Subway stations in Chaoyang District
Railway stations in China opened in 2019